Freshwater is a settlement in Newfoundland and Labrador. It is located on Bell Island, just west of Bickfordville and south of Wabana.

Populated places in Newfoundland and Labrador